The 2014 Abilene Christian baseball team represents Abilene Christian University in the 2014 intercollegiate baseball season. Abilene Christian competes in Division I of the National Collegiate Athletic Association (NCAA) as a charter member of the Southland Conference. The Wildcats play home games at Crutcher Scott Field on the university's campus in Abilene, Texas. Eighteenth season head coach Ty Harrington leads the Wildcats.

Personnel

Coaches

Players

Schedule

Notes

References

External links
 Official website

Abilene Christian Wildcats baseball seasons
Abilene Christian
Abilene Christian